Henryk Chmielewski (8 January 1914 – 15 November 1998) was a Polish boxer who competed in the 1936 Summer Olympics. He was born in Łódź, Poland.

In 1936 he finished fourth in the middleweight class. After his loss in the semifinal bout against Henry Tiller he was not able to fight in the bronze medal bout against Raúl Villarreal.

He won gold medal in the European Amateur Boxing Championships, at Milan 1937.

In 1938, he emigrated to the United States, where he became a professional boxer (Henry Chemel).  He died in Hollywood, Florida.

He was the winner of the Aleksander Reksza Boxing Award 1987.

References

1914 births
1998 deaths
Sportspeople from Łódź
Middleweight boxers
Olympic boxers of Poland
Boxers at the 1936 Summer Olympics
Polish emigrants to the United States
Polish male boxers
20th-century Polish people